Pico da Neblina is a Brazilian drama television series that premiered on HBO Brazil and Latin America on August 4, 2019. It depicts a scenario in which marijuana has been legalized in Brazil and following the story of a former drug dealer who needs to find a way to keep working.

The title is a pun on the meaning of 'high', as Pico da Neblina is the highest peak in Brazil.

Premise
The series follows the story of Biriba (Luís Navarro), a young drug trafficker from São Paulo who, after the legalization of marijuana in Brazil, decides to abandon his life on crime and sell his weed legally along with an inexperienced investor partner. But Salim (Henrique Santana), his childhood friend, decides to follow as an old-fashioned drug dealer in the illegality.

Cast and characters

 Luis Navarro as Biriba
 Henrique Santana as Salim
 Teca Pereira as Irene
 Daniel Furlan as Vini
 Maria Zilda Bethlem as Suzette Tortoriello
 Leilah Moreno as Kelly
 Dexter as CD
 William Costa as Piolho
 Bruno Giordano as Fernão
 Sabrina Petraglia as Nanda
 Bruce de Araújo as Digão
 Lenita Oliver as Marcela
 Fabio Marcoff as Joselo
 Renata Carvalho as Carmen
 Alex Gruli as Sargento Lopes
 Ivan de Almeida as Bigode
 Nathalia Ernesto as Laura
 Inara as Gabriela
 Che Moais as Pescoço
 Henrique Brandon as Torneira
 Gabriel Salazar as Buiú
 Nayobé Nzainab as Amanda
 Fabio Nepô as Bigato
 Jorge Neto as Rick
 JB Oliveira as Nelsinho
 Irayó as Caniço
 Jota Estevam as young CD
 Marina Mathey as young Carmen

Production

Conception and development 
According to the director Quico Meirelles, when Pico da Neblina was being produced, in 2015, he imagined that, when the series would be premiered, in 2019, cannabis would already been legalized in Brazil. But what he saw was a twist in the opposite direction, with the discussions paralyzed in the National Congress of Brazil. The director said he could only imagine what this hypothetical Brazil would be like, based on experiences from other countries that have already legalized the drug, as part of Europe, Uruguay, Canada and the United States.

HBO Latin America announced the production of the series during the 2018 Rio2C (Rio Creative Conference) event. It was revealed that the first season of the series consisting of ten episodes would be produced by Academy Award nominated director Fernando Meirelles.

Release

Broadcast
The series premiered simultaneously on HBO Brazil, HBO Latin America and the streaming service HBO Go on August 4, 2019. In Spain, the series premiered on August 5, 2019, on HBO España.

References

2019 Brazilian television series debuts
2010s Brazilian television series
Brazilian drama television series
Portuguese-language television shows
Television series about illegal drug trade
Television series about cannabis
Television shows filmed in São Paulo (state)
HBO Latin America original programming
Portuguese-language HBO original programming